The Argentine Open or Abierto de la República or Abierto de Argentina is one of the oldest national golf open championships. First played in 1905, when it was called the Open Championship of the River Plate, it has featured numerous notable winners including eleven major champions Henry Picard (1937), Paul Runyan (1938), Jimmy Demaret (1941), Lloyd Mangrum (1946), Roberto De Vicenzo (1944, 1949, 1951, 1952,1958, 1965, 1967, 1970, 1974) Tom Weiskopf (1979), Craig Stadler (1992), Mark Calcavecchia (1993, 1995), Mark O'Meara (1994), Jim Furyk (1997) and Ángel Cabrera (2001, 2002, 2012).

History
The championship is part of PGA Tour Latinoamérica, also featuring on the European Tour on one occasion, in 2001. In the subsequent years, the Argentine financial crisis later in 2001 resulted in substantially reduced prize money. From 2005 to 2008 the tournament was a fixture on the European Challenge Tour. In 2008 it was rescheduled to April, which meant that the Argentine Open appeared twice during the 2008 Challenge Tour season.

The record for most victories is held by 1967 British Open champion Roberto De Vicenzo, who won the title on nine occasions between 1944 and 1974. The next most successful players are Vicente Fernández, with eight victories over a 32 years span between 1968 and 2000 and José Jurado, who won seven times between the 1920 and 1931. 

The first championship, held in 1905, was won by Mungo Park Jr. (son of Willie Park Sr. and brother of Willie Park Jr.). 

The low amateur is presented with the Pereyra Iraola Cup.

Starting in 2016, the event gave the winner an exemption into The Open Championship.

Winners

Notes

References

External links
Coverage on PGA Tour Latinoamérica's official site
Coverage on the European Tour's official site (2001)
Coverage on the Challenge Tour's official site (2005–2008)

Golf tournaments in Argentina
PGA Tour Latinoamérica events
Former European Tour events
Former Challenge Tour events
Former Tour de las Américas events
Recurring sporting events established in 1905
1905 establishments in Argentina